Kelsh is a surname. Notable people with the surname include:
 Jerry Kelsh (born 1940), American politician
 Matt Kelsh (1904–1991), American football player
 Scot Kelsh (born 1962), American politician